Bring It! was an American dance reality television series that debuted March 5, 2014, on Lifetime. On April 28, 2014, Lifetime announced an additional 10-episode renewal of Bring It!. Additional episodes returned on July 23, 2014. The second season premiered on January 23, 2015. New episodes aired on July 31, 2015. The third season premiered on January 1, 2016. On December 1, 2016, Lifetime renewed the show for a fourth season, which premiered on January 13, 2017. Concurrent, Lifetime added a traveling tour, Bring It Live! Lifetime renewed the show for a fifth season, which premiered on March 2, 2018.

Premise
Bring It! is set in Jackson, Mississippi and features Coach Dianna "Miss D" Williams and her Dollhouse Dance Factory, home of Miss D's Dancing Dolls team, which was founded in 2001. The troupe has over 15 Grand Champion titles and more than 100 trophies, and consists of children aged 10 to 17. The show also features the Baby Dancing Dolls, consisting of children under the age of 11.

The team competes in hip-hop majorette competitions, with their main focus being on the Stand Battle (a routine where two teams face each other and alternate "stands" (routines), which are called by the captain depending on what stand the other team performs).  The team slogan (both the Dancing Dolls and the Baby Dancing Dolls) is "Dancing Dolls For Life" (popularly shortened to DD4L, featured on much of their gear).

Rival dance teams featured on the show include: the Divas of Olive Branch (the Dolls main rival, due to the intense rivalry between Miss D and Divas coach Neva), the Prancing Tigerettes (from Memphis) and the Infamous Dancerettes (f/k/a Dynamic Diamond Dollz, also from Memphis), the Purple Diamonds (a cross-town Jackson rival), the YCDT Superstarz (from Miami) and new rival (from Tupelo, Mississippi) The Golden Prancerettes.

Similar to fellow Lifetime show Dance Moms, Bring It! features the moms of several of the dancers and their interactions (and occasional arguments) with Miss D.  However, unlike Dance Moms (where the moms are in a room above the studio watching the practices), the moms in Bring It! are featured outside the studio.  In early seasons, the parents could only see what happens in practice through the studio windows; in later seasons Miss D has made a room for the parents to watch the girls through a TV screen. (Miss D does not allow parents inside the studio during practices, believing that the dancers need to have only one person – Miss D – leading them at those times.)

Cast

DD4L
 Kayla, The Former Captain of the Dancing Dolls and excels at hip-hop and majorette. Kayla was promoted from captain to assistant coach in Season 2, now that her position was taken by Camryn. Kayla hopes that Camryn can uphold the responsibility like she did. 
 Camryn, Captain (now former) of The Dancing Dolls. Excels in majorette, lyrical, and jazz. Camryn was promoted from Drill Master to Co-Captain in Season 1 and then Captain in Season 2. Camryn's dance techniques often intimidate the rest of the dancers, and now that she is captain, the team respects her more.
 Sunjai, Star, and Sky. Sunjai excels at majorette, jazz, and tap. Sunjai was a struggling dancer in Season 1 with her main goal being to make stand battle but always got cut. Before the end of Season 1, she finally made the cuts for stand battle, as the series progressed her dance techniques improved as well. Sunjai made her departure at the end of Season 2, due to graduation. Star and Sky are Sunjai's younger twin sisters. They are constantly mixed up by the DDPs and Coach Dianna.
 Crystianna, One of the Co-Captain of the Dancing Dolls. Crystianna excels at majorette and acro. Having been the youngest member of the stand battle team, she is always a good dancer to look at. Being a quiet but fierce dancer, she earned the nickname the "Silent Killer".
 Faith,  Faith is a member of the Dancing Dolls who was introduced in Season 3. She excels in many aspects of dance, but is new to majorette.
 Jalen, Was originally a Dancing Doll before she was removed in 2010. She returned to the Dancing Dolls in 2015 after being a member on the Purple Diamonds.
 Tanesha, Who suffers from performance anxiety and later becomes Head DrillMaster in 2018.
 Angel and Angela, Angela ends up making battle squad her first year on the team.
 Madyson, Came from the Purple Diamonds to the Dancing Dolls. Madyson was awarded DrillMaster in 2018.
 Princess, Former Prancing Tigerettes Captain who joins the Dancing Dolls. Princess is the former captain of the Dancing Dolls of Atlanta.
 Jaylene, A New York contortionist who joins the Dancing Dolls in Season 5. She was briefly on the Dancing Dolls of Atlanta. 
Tré and Quad, Are twins and male hip-hop dancers.

Opposing team coaches
 Matthew Thomas is the coach of Dance Force Elite of Chicago, Illinois
 Joerick Grice is the coach of the up & coming Golden Prancerettes of Tupelo, Mississippi
 Quincy Oliver is coach of the Prancing Tigerettes
 John Connor is the coach of the Infamous Dancerettes (beginning in Season 2); he was previously (Season 1) coach of the Dynamic Diamond Dollz
 Neva McGruder is coach of the Divas of Olive Branch; the rivalry between Neva and Miss D extends beyond the dance floor
Shanika Lee is the coach of the Purple Diamonds, the Dolls' Jackson cross-town rival
 Traci Young-Byron is coach of the YCDT Supastarz and was once a dancer for the Miami Heat (beginning September 2015 Ms. Young-Byron and YCDT will be featured in a spin-off series, Step It Up!)
 Fulvia Ford is coach of Virtuous Divine of Greenwood, Mississippi 
Rick Calloway, Penelope Holloway are the coaches of The Dazzling Divas of Macon GA. "F.A.D.D"
 Helenor Wade Dazzlin Starz coach
 Kehli "Professor Kehlz" Berry is the coach of The Divas of Compton
 Rodney Jones is the coach of the Pearls of Perfection of Macon GA.
 Tyrus Sellers is the coach of Elite Starz of Nashville.
 Charkeitha Ramey is the coach of Xplosive Dance Company of Dallas, Texas
 McCoy W. Flood is the coach of The Lowndes County Dance Company (LCDC) of Columbus, Mississippi.
 Chelsea Thomas is the coach of Divas of Dance of Lake Charles, Louisiana
 Arlando Durham & Donnie Lynn are the coaches of Black Ice of Cincinnati, Ohio

Other cast members
 Robert Williams is Dianna's husband
 Cobe Williams is Dianna's son
 Terrell is Kayla's dad
 Calvin is Camryn's dad
 JJ is Sunjai, Star and Sky's dad
 Dominic is Faith's dad
 Jay Fever Announcer/Event Host
 Torrey (Technique and Ballet Instructor)
  Marquell Assissant coach (Season 5) 
 Ariel Assistant Coach

Episodes

Season 1 (2014)

Season 2 (2015)

Season 3 (2016)

Season 4 (2017–18)

Season 5 (2018–19)

International Broadcasts
In the United Kingdom, Lifetime UK premiered the series in late 2014, in 2016 another UK channel, ITVBe premiered the series on Friday September 2, 2016.

References

External links
 
 Dollhouse Dance Factory

2010s American reality television series
2014 American television series debuts
2019 American television series endings
Cheerleading television series
English-language television shows
Lifetime (TV network) original programming
Dance competition television shows
Television series about children
Television series about teenagers
Television shows set in Mississippi